Bassmaster Classic XLI was held February 18–20, 2011 in the Louisiana Delta surrounding New Orleans, Louisiana. Kevin VanDam of Kalamazoo, Michigan, won the event with a three-day total weight of 69 pounds, 11 ounces. He won $500,000 in prize money. The total weight for the classic was 1,506 pounds, 5 ounces with the heaviest average bass weight being 2.6850 pounds.

Top 5 finishers1. Kevin VanDam, 69-112. Aaron Martens, 59-003. Derek Remitz, 56-084. Brandon Palaniuk, 31-095. Brent Chapman, 31-03

See also
Bassmaster Classic

References

External links
 Official site

Fishing tournaments
Sports in Louisiana
Fishing tournaments
2011 in sports in Louisiana
Fishing in the United States